Jobbins is a surname. Notable people with the surname include:

Boak Jobbins (1947–2012), Australian Anglican cleric
Joy Jobbins (born 1927), Australian writer
Sheridan Jobbins (born 1959), Australian journalist, television presenter, and screenwriter